Muskoka Airport  is a small regional airport located  south of Bracebridge, Ontario, Canada. The airport is classified as an airport of entry by Nav Canada and is staffed by the Canada Border Services Agency (CBSA) on a call-out basis. CBSA officers at this airport can handle general aviation aircraft only, with no more than 15 passengers.

History

The airport began construction in 1933 as part of the make-work project during the Great Depression. Staff were paid $1 plus keep per day to clear and level the landing strip. It was opened in 1936 as Reay Airport and renamed to the current name in 1938. From 1942 to end of World War II, it served as a training facility for the Royal Norwegian Air Force. Known as "Little Norway", it replaced the Toronto Island Airport as their main training base in Canada. The Royal Canadian Air Force (RCAF) used Muskoka Airport as an auxiliary airfield to CFB Borden during World War II.

Military use ended and ownership of the airport was transferred to Transport Canada. During the mid 20th century the airport was an emergency landing facility for Trans Canada Airlines and the RCAF. The airport has been owned by the District Municipality of Muskoka since 1996. A permanent memorial dedicated to the airport's contribution to Norway's air force was opened in 2007.

The airport is used by general aviation, charters and other operators:

 Royal Canadian Mounted Police
 Canadian Forces
 Ontario Ministry of Natural Resources

Airlines and destinations

Passenger

Cargo

References

External links
Official site
 

Certified airports in Ontario
Royal Norwegian Air Force stations
1936 establishments in Ontario
Airports established in 1936